is a Japanese former swimmer who competed in the 1988 Summer Olympics.

References

1971 births
Living people
Japanese female freestyle swimmers
Olympic swimmers of Japan
Swimmers at the 1988 Summer Olympics